Deraz Ab-e Olya (also Romanized as Derāz Āb-e ‘Olyā; also known as Derāz Āb-e Bālā) is a village in Bagh-e Keshmir Rural District, Salehabad County, Razavi Khorasan Province, Iran. At the 2006 census, its population was 539, in 112 families.

References 

Populated places in   Torbat-e Jam County